Eladio Rodríguez González (July 27, 1864 – April 14, 1949) was a Galician language poet and author associated with the Galicia region of Spain. In 2001, he was honored in the Galician Literature Day.

External links
Eladio Rodríguez González

Writers from Galicia (Spain)
Linguists of Galician
1864 births
1949 deaths